Pegando con tubo is a 1961 Mexican comedy film directed by Jaime Salvador and starring the double act Viruta y Capulina, performed by Marco Antonio Campos and Gaspar Henaine.

Cast
Marco Antonio Campos as Viruta
Gaspar Henaine as Capulina
Rosina Navarro as Rosina Manzano
Socorro Navarro as Socorro Manzano
Quintín Bulnes as El Rascabuches
Arturo Castro as Don José Manzano
José Jasso as Sergeant
Roberto Meyer as Commander
Francisco Reiguera as Doctor
Arturo Bosch] as Policeman		
Mario García "Harapos" as Policeman		
Francisco Meneses as Policeman		
Felipe de Flores as Policeman		
Mario Cid as Theatre actor (uncredited)
Pedro Elviro (uncredited)

External links

1961 comedy films
Films with screenplays by Roberto Gómez Bolaños
1961 films
Mexican comedy films
1960s Mexican films